Thikana is a 1987 Hindi crime drama film directed by Mahesh Bhatt. It stars Smita Patil, Anil Kapoor and Amrita Singh in lead roles.

Plot
Alcoholic lawyer Ravi Goel (Anil Kapoor) does not get cases because he refuses to lie. He lives with his mother (Rohini Hattangadi) and sister Shashi (Smita Patil), who also happens to be the breadwinner for the family.

MP Rane (Avtar Gill) rapes a girl and is videotaped by a cameraman, (Madan Jain). Rane has both of them killed. Meanwhile, Shashi becomes pregnant from Ranveer Singh (Suresh Oberoi). She refuses to marry him because she feels that when she would leave her family, they would be in trouble. Ranbir convinces Ravi to take on cases to fight in the court.

Tea shop owner Chakradhari (Satish Kaushik) tells Ravi that dancer Shaila (Amrita Singh)'s brother has been missing for some time. Ravi begins searching for her brother and discovering his death, tries to find the killers.

Cast
Smita Patil as Shashi Goel 
Anil Kapoor as Ravi Goel
Amrita Singh as Shaila
Satish Kaushik as Chakradhari
Anupam Kher as Inspector Anwar Ali 
Suresh Oberoi as Inspector Ranveer Singh
Rohini Hattangadi as Mrs. Goel 
Avtar Gill as MP Rane
Madan Jain as Cameraman Avinash

Songs
Anjaan wrote the songs.

Production
During the film's shooting actress Smita Patil became pregnant but continued working for the film. She cited that housemaids also work when they are pregnant. She died on 13 December 1986 due to childbirth complications, just a few days after the birth of her and Raj Babbar's son Prateik Babbar.

Arshad Warsi assisted Bhatt for Kaash and Thikana.

Reception
Akshay Shah of Planet Bollywood gave the film a rating of 8/10. He praised the story, direction, Suresh Oberoi and Anil Kapoor's performance. Shah felt that Kapoor's performance was under-rated. He called Patil a "disappointment" and termed the remaining cast as "average". He also said that Paresh Rawal or Kader Khan could have done better than Avtar Gill in the MP's role. Mint Nandini Ramnath called Patil's role one of her most underrated ones. DAWN has called the film "one of [Bhatt's] most searching studies of flexible middle-class morality". Despite the critical acclaim, it was a commercial failure.

References

External links
 

1987 films
1980s Hindi-language films
Films directed by Mahesh Bhatt
Films scored by Kalyanji Anandji